Diego Hidalgo may refer to:

 Diego Hidalgo (tennis) (born 1993), Ecuadorian tennis player
 Diego Hidalgo y Durán (1886–1961), Spanish intellectual, entrepreneur, and politician during the Spanish Second Republic
 Diego Hidalgo Schnur (born 1942), his son, Spanish intellectual, philanthropist, and businessman